Brian Glenn Wilson (born February 15, 1956) is an American former anchor reporter for Fox News. He is a past chairman of the Capitol Hill Radio/TV Correspondents' Association. He currently hosts The Drive with Brian Wilson on SuperTalk 99.7 WTN, a talk radio station in Nashville.

Early life and education 
Wilson was born and raised in Odessa, Texas. Wilson holds a master’s degree in print journalism from American University, where he also served as an adjunct professor in the university's communication school.

Career 
Wilson began his career as a reporter at KFDA, the CBS affiliate station in Amarillo, Texas, then worked at KTPX in Odessa, Texas, and as a reporter in Mobile, Alabama. Wilson then served as a reporter and anchor on WTTG in Washington, D.C.

Wilson hosted a D.C.-based weekend program on Fox News and appeared once as a substitute anchor for Brit Hume on the weekday program Special Report with Brit Hume. From 2003 to 2006, Wilson was also the congressional correspondent for the network. In January 2007, he was promoted to the Washington bureau chief for Fox News.

In 2007, Fox News reporter Rudi Bakhtiar said she rebuffed sexual advances from Wilson, which she claims led to her dismissal at Fox News. As a result of these allegations, in mid-September 2010 Howard Kurtz of The Washington Post reported that Wilson had resigned from the network, adding that the breakup between Fox and Wilson "wasn't pretty." 

In 2011, Wilson joined 630 WMAL Washington DC/105.9 WMAL-FM Woodbridge Virginia as a host. He left the station in 2018.

In February 2018, Cumulus Media signed Wilson as the new host of its Nashville Morning News show on News Talk radio station SuperTalk 99.7 WWTN-FM.

In the 2019 film, Bombshell, which details Wilson's sexual harassment of Rudi Bakhtiar along with other events preceding Roger Ailes' firing after sexual misconduct allegations, Wilson is portrayed by Brian d'Arcy James.

References

External links 
 Biography on FoxNews.com
 WMAL's Morning Show

1956 births
American television reporters and correspondents
American University School of Communication alumni
Living people
Fox News people
20th-century American journalists
21st-century American journalists
American male journalists
People from Odessa, Texas
Journalists from Texas
American University faculty and staff